This is a list of Navy Cross recipients for actions of valor carried out during the Korean War, awarded by the United States Department of the Navy.

The Korean War was an escalation of border clashes between two rival Korean regimes, created at the end of World War II by the division of Korea into two occupation zones (a U.S. and Soviet one), with each Korean regime trying to topple the other through political and guerrilla tactics. In a very narrow sense, some may refer to it as a civil war, though many other factors were at play. After failing to strengthen their cause in the free elections held in South Korea during May 1950 and the refusal of South Korea to hold new elections per North Korean demands, the communist North Korean Army moved south on June 25, 1950 to attempt to reunite the Korean peninsula, which had been formally divided since 1948. The conflict was then expanded by the United States and the Soviet Union's involvement as part of the larger Cold War. The main hostilities were during the period from June 25, 1950 until an armistice was signed on July 27, 1953.

, this list is incomplete, showing 270 Navy Crosses awarded in all service branches for actions of valor during the Korean War: 43 to US Navy recipients; 224 to US Marine Corps recipients; and one US Army recipient. By partial comparison, the U.S. Department of Defense shows 49 awarded to Navy recipients and 248 to Marines Corps recipients, for acts of valor during the Korean War.

A

B

C

D–E

F–G

H

I–K

L

M

N–O

P–Q

R

S

T–V

W

X–Z

See also 
 List of Korean War Medal of Honor recipients
 List of Navy Cross recipients for World War II
 List of Navy Cross recipients for the Vietnam War

References

External links 
 
 Top 3 are: Medal of Honor; Distinguished Service Cross / Navy Cross / Air Force Cross; Silver Star
 this US DOD source only reports US Navy and US Marine Corps recipients of the Navy Cross
 
 this long standing private source believes it is "99.9% complete" for all military, civilian and allied recipients of the Top 2 (above Silver Star)

Navy Cross recipients